Karkashshi (Karkašši) was a city in ancient Media.

Karkashshi was first mentioned as Garkasia, a Median settlement paying tribute to Assyrian king Shalmaneser II (1030–1019 BCE). Karkashshi was later mentioned in tablets found in Nineveh, dating from the 7th-century BCE. During the 670s BCE, it was in the possession of Median chieftain, Kashtariti. 

In an article for the Journal asiatique in 1880, Joseph Halévy proposed that Karkashshi was located in Karkathiokertha (Karkasiokertha) in Armenia. However, he later withdrew his interpretation. It is now generally believed that Karkashshi was located in Media, within the Central Zagros Mountains (present-day Iran). Karkashshi may have been presumably located near modern-day Karkasheh.

References

Sources

Medes